The 2020 Fresno mayoral election was held on March 3, 2020, to elect the mayor of Fresno, California. Republican Jerry Dyer was elected after winning a majority in the primary.

Incumbent mayor Lee Brand did not run for a second term. It was the first time in the city's history in which an incumbent eligible for re-election chose to retire the seat.

Municipal elections are officially nonpartisan; candidates' party affiliations do not appear on the ballot. However, a few candidates had, either previously or during their campaigns, publicly affiliated with political parties. Jerry Dyer identified as a Republican, Andrew Janz identified as a Democrat, and Nickolas Wildstar identified as a Libertarian.

Candidates

Declared 
 Jerry Dyer, former Fresno Chief of Police
 Bill Gates, immigrant and businessman
 Floyd Harris Jr., civil rights activist and pastor
 Brian Jefferson, homeless advocate
 Richard Renteria, former insurance broker and candidate for mayor in 2016
 Nickolas Wildstar, political activist, rapper, and candidate for governor in 2018 and Fullerton City Council in 2018

Withdrew 
 Elliot Balch, operations officer of the Central Valley Community Foundation
 Luis Chavez, city council member

Declined 
 Lee Brand, incumbent mayor

Endorsements

Polling

Results 
Since Dyer won a majority in the initial round of voting, no runoff needed to be held. If one was required, it would have taken place on November 3, 2020.

See also 
 2020 California elections

Footnotes

Notes

References 

Fresno
Fresno
2020
Fresno mayoral election